Mangalwar Peth is an old neighbourhood or ward in the city of Pune. It was settled in 1662 when Mughal Subahdar Shaista Khan came to Pune to defeat Shivaji. At the time this area was known as Astapura. 
This peth, or district, is bordered by Kasba Peth and Somwar Peth. Areas of the peth suffered severe damage  during the Panshet dam floods of 1961. The temple of Trisund Ganapati and Omkareshwar as well as the Kamla Nehru hospital are located in this area. This district is famous for transportation business. This area also has the popular Juna Bazaar (Flea Market) on the banks of the Mutha river.

References

External links
Mangalwar Peth, Pune (Wikimapia)

Peths in Pune